The 2014–15 Moldovan Women's Cup is the 18th edition of the Moldovan annual football tournament. The competition began on 9 October 2014 with the Preliminary Round and will end with the final held in May 2015.

Preliminary round
Matches took place on 9 October and 23 October 2014. Two teams have a bye to the semi-finals.

Semi-finals
Played on 7 May and 21 May 2015.

Final

References

External links
Official website

Moldovan Women's Cup seasons
Moldovan Women's Cup 2014-15
Moldova